Mansurlu can refer to:

Mansurlu, Azerbaijan
Mansurlu, Iran